The 2019 Vanderbilt Commodores baseball team represents Vanderbilt University in the 2019 NCAA Division I baseball season. The Commodores play their home games at Hawkins Field. The team compiled a record of 59-12 and won the 2019 NCAA National Championship, as well as the SEC regular-season and tournament championships.

Preseason

Preseason All-American teams

1st Team
J. J. Bleday – Outfielder (Baseball America)
2nd Team
Drake Fellows – Starting Pitcher (Collegiate Baseball)
J. J. Bleday – Outfielder (D1Baseball)
Austin Martin – Second Baseman (NCBWA)

3rd Team
Drake Fellows – Starting Pitcher (Perfect Game)
Stephen Scott – Outfielder (Collegiate Baseball)

SEC media poll
The SEC media poll was released on February 7, 2019 with the Commodores predicted to win the Eastern Division and the SEC Championship.

Preseason All-SEC teams

1st Team
Philip Clarke – Catcher
Austin Martin – Second Baseman

2nd Team
J.J. Bleday – Outfielder

Roster

Schedule and results

Schedule Source:
*Rankings are based on the team's current ranking in the D1Baseball poll.

Nashville Regional

Nashville Super Regional

College World Series

Record vs. conference opponents

Rankings

2019 MLB draft

Vanderbilt had 13 players selected in the 2019 MLB draft, tying a SEC record.

References

Vanderbilt
Vanderbilt Commodores baseball seasons
Vanderbilt Commodores baseball
Vanderbilt
College World Series seasons
NCAA Division I Baseball Championship seasons
Southeastern Conference baseball champion seasons